Gypsy Rose Lee (born Rose Louise Hovick, January 8, 1911 – April 26, 1970) was an American burlesque entertainer, stripper, and vedette famous for her striptease act. Also an actress, author, and playwright, her 1957 memoir was adapted into the 1959 stage musical Gypsy.

Early life
Rose Louise Hovick was born in Seattle, Washington, on January 8, 1911; however, she always gave January 9 as her date of birth. She was known as Louise to her family. Her sister, actress June Havoc, was born in 1912. Their mother, Rose Thompson Hovick, forged various birth certificates for each of her daughters—older when needed to evade varying state child labor laws, and younger for reduced or free train fares. The girls were unsure until later in life what their years of birth were.

Their mother had married Norwegian-American John Olaf Hovick, a newspaper-advertising salesman and a reporter at The Seattle Times. They married on May 28, 1910, in Seattle. They divorced on August 20, 1915. Rose Thompson married her second husband, Judson Brennerman, a traveling salesman, on May 26, 1916, at a Unitarian church in Seattle, with the Rev. J. D. A. Powers officiating.

After Hovick and Brennerman divorced, June supported the family by appearing in vaudeville, being billed "Tiniest Toe Dancer in the World" when she was only . Rose and June went to Hollywood for two years where June appeared in short films directed by Hal Roach. Louise was left behind while June and her mother were on the road. She had an elementary education, unlike June who was taught to read by stagehands. Much to her mother's displeasure, June eloped with Bobby Reed, a dancer in their act, in December 1928, after a performance in Topeka, Kansas, at the Jayhawk Theatre and went on to pursue a brief career in marathon dancing, a more profitable vocation than tap dancing.

Career
Louise's singing and dancing talents were insufficient to sustain the act without June. Eventually, it became apparent that Louise could make money in burlesque, which earned her legendary status as an elegant and witty striptease artist. Initially, her act was propelled forward when a shoulder strap on one of her gowns gave way, causing her dress to fall to her feet despite her efforts to cover herself; encouraged by the audience's response, she went on to make the trick the focus of her performance.

Her innovations were an almost casual stripping style compared to bump & grind styles of most burlesque strippers (she emphasized the "tease" in "striptease"), and she brought a sharp sense of humor into her act as well. She became as famous for her onstage wit as for her stripping style, and—changing her stage name to Gypsy Rose Lee—she became one of the biggest stars of Minsky's Burlesque, where she performed for four years. She was frequently arrested in raids on the Minsky brothers' shows. During the Great Depression, Lee spoke at various union meetings in support of New York laborers. According to activist Harry Fisher, her talks were among those that attracted the largest audiences.

In 1937 and 1938, billed as Louise Hovick, she made five films in Hollywood. But her acting was generally panned, so she returned to New York City where she had an affair with film producer Michael Todd and co-produced and appeared in his 1942 musical revue, Star and Garter.

Lee viewed herself as a "high-class" stripper, and she approved of H. L. Mencken's term "ecdysiast", which he coined as a more "dignified" way of referring to the profession. Her style of intellectual recitation while stripping was spoofed in the number "Zip!" in Rodgers and Hart's Pal Joey, a musical in which June Havoc had appeared on Broadway, opposite Gene Kelly. Lee performed an abbreviated version of her act (intellectual recitation and all) in the 1943 film Stage Door Canteen.

In 1941, Lee authored a mystery thriller called The G-String Murders, which was made into the sanitized 1943 film, Lady of Burlesque starring Barbara Stanwyck. While some assert this was in fact ghost-written by Craig Rice, there are those who claim that there is more than sufficient written evidence in the form of manuscripts and Lee's own correspondence to prove that she wrote a large part of the novel herself under the guidance of Rice and others, including her editor George Davis, a friend and mentor. Lee's second murder mystery, Mother Finds a Body, was published in 1942. In December 1942, preliminary papers alleging breach of contract were filed in the Supreme Court against Lee by Dorothy Wheelock, associate editor of Harper's Bazaar, alleging that in August 1940 she and Gypsy entered into what Wheelock described as "an oral agreement to collaborate on a joint venture involving the conception, construction, development, writing and exploitation of a literary work with a burlesque background. The agreement, Miss Wheelock went on, called for a 50:50 split on all income from sale of the book. She charged that she had lined up a publisher for the book when, in November 1940, Gypsy called off the collaboration…  Lee said she turned over notes and other material to Miss Wheelock and that the latter had then written 'a sample book'.  However this sample book is not the book that was published, Gypsy declared. She denied any resemblance between Miss Wheelock's book and the book published under her own name, except such similarities as might stem from the notes Gypsy turned over to Miss Wheelock. Simon & Schuster agreed to publish the book, Gypsy said, after the first three chapters were shown to them by Janet Flanner, a New York writer". The case was settled out of court.

Relationships
In Hollywood, she married Arnold "Bob" Mizzy on August 25, 1937, at the insistence of the film studio. She obtained a divorce in 1941, claiming cruelty, although biographer Noralee Frankel suggests the couple agreed that Lee could bring false charges so the divorce could go through uncontested. In 1942, she married William Alexander Kirkland; they divorced in 1944. While married to Kirkland, she gave birth on December 11, 1944, to a son fathered by Otto Preminger. Her son was named Erik Lee, but has since been known successively as Erik Kirkland, Erik de Diego, and Erik Lee Preminger. Gypsy married a third time in 1948, to Julio de Diego, but that union also ended in divorce.

In 1940, she purchased a townhouse on East 63rd St in Manhattan with a private courtyard, 26 rooms and seven baths. Mother Rose continued to demand money from Lee and Havoc. Lee rented a 10-room apartment on West End Avenue in Manhattan for Rose, who opened a boardinghouse for women there. On one occasion in the 1930s, Rose shot and killed a woman who was either a guest at the boardinghouse or a guest on the farm in Highland Mills in Orange County, New York, that Rose owned. A historical website cites varying reports of which place was the scene of the crime. According to Gypsy's son Erik Lee Preminger, who is the author of several books, the murder victim was Mother Rose's female lover, who had allegedly made a pass at Gypsy. The violent incident was investigated and reportedly explained away as a suicide. Mother Rose was not prosecuted.  Mother Rose's biographer strongly refutes the notion that this woman, Genevieve Augustine, was Rose's lover, and doubts Rose's complicity in her death in light of Augustine's previous suicide attempts. Rose Thompson Hovick died in 1954 of colon cancer.

Later years

After the death of their mother, the sisters now felt free to write about her without risking a lawsuit. Gypsy: A Memoir was  published in 1957 and served as inspiration for the Jule Styne, Stephen Sondheim, and Arthur Laurents 1959 musical Gypsy. Havoc did not like the way she was portrayed in the piece, but she was eventually persuaded not to oppose it for her sister's sake. The show and the 1962 movie adaptation assured Gypsy a steady income. The sisters became estranged for a period of time but reconciled. June, in turn, wrote Early Havoc and More Havoc, to relate her version of the story.

Gypsy Rose Lee went on to host a daytime San Francisco KGO-TV television talk show,  The Gypsy Rose Lee Show (754 episodes, aired 1965–1968). The popular afternoon show featured such guests as Judy Garland, Agnes Moorehead, and Woody Allen, showcasing her love of people, pets and knitting among other interests.

Like well-known artists such as Pablo Picasso and Ernest Hemingway, Gypsy Rose Lee was a supporter of the Popular Front movement in the Spanish Civil War and raised money for charity to alleviate the suffering of Spanish children during the conflict. "She became politically active, and supported Spanish Loyalists during Spain's Civil War. She also became a fixture at Communist United Front meetings, and was investigated by the House Committee on un-American activities." Lee was a Democrat who supported the campaign of Adlai Stevenson in the 1952 presidential election.  The walls of her Los Angeles home were adorned with pictures by Joan Miró, Pablo Picasso, Marc Chagall, Max Ernst, and Dorothea Tanning, all reportedly given to her by the artists themselves.

In 1969, she performed for American troops in Vietnam, who, she said, "considered her their sexy grandmother".

Death
Lee died of lung cancer in Los Angeles in 1970, aged 59. Upon her death, she left an estate valued at US$575,000 (US$4,000,000 in 2021). She is buried in Inglewood Park Cemetery in Inglewood, California.

Legacy

The song "Zip" from the musical Pal Joey, written by Richard Rodgers and Lorenz Hart, imagines the thoughts and musings that go through Gypsy Rose Lee's mind while she strips onstage as recounted by way of an interviewer who sings of their encounter with Miss Lee as being "the greatest achievement" they'd had. Elaine Stritch regularly performed this song (as the interviewer) for many years.
 Punk band The Distillers wrote "Gypsy Rose Lee", a song for their debut album in 2000.
 In 1973, Tony Orlando and Dawn recorded "Say, Has Anybody Seen My Sweet Gypsy Rose" by W. M. Irwin Levine & L. Russell Brown. (The song refers to Lee's profession, but is about a fictional character with a similar name.)
 In January 2012, Seattle Theater Writers (a group of arts critics for various publications) awarded the first Gypsy Rose Lee Awards, celebrating excellence in local theatre.
 The Academy Film Archive has preserved a number of Lee's home movies, including behind-the-scenes footage from films in which she appeared.

Selected stage work

Filmography

Recordings

Works

Novels
 The G-String Murders (New York: Simon & Schuster, 1941).
 Mother Finds a Body (New York: Simon & Schuster, 1942).

Memoir
 Gypsy: A Memoir (New York: Harper & Bros., 1957)

Plays
 The Naked Genius (1943) (filmed and released as Doll Face in 1946). Her original title for the play was The Ghost in the Woodpile.

Notes

References

Further reading
  Reprinted as

External links

 
 
 Gypsy Rose Lee at TVGuide.com
 Gypsy Rose Lee at Washington State History Online Encyclopedia
 Rose and June Hovick
 Gypsy Rose Lee papers, 1910–1970, held by the Billy Rose Theatre Division, New York Public Library for the Performing Arts
 Before burlesque, Gypsy Rose Lee performed at Jayhawk Theatre Accessed June 20, 2019

1911 births
1970 deaths
20th-century American actresses
Actresses from Seattle
American people of German descent
American people of Norwegian descent
American female erotic dancers
American erotic dancers
American film actresses
American television actresses
American vedettes
Burials at Inglewood Park Cemetery
American burlesque performers
Deaths from lung cancer in California
Vaudeville performers
Vedettes (cabaret)
People from Highland Falls, New York
Dancers from Washington (state)
Dancers from New York (state)
Hollywood blacklist
California Democrats
Washington (state) Democrats
New York (state) Democrats
20th-century American dancers